Aharon Megged (10 August 1920 – 23 March 2016) (Hebrew year 5680) was an Israeli author and playwright. In 2003, he was awarded the Israel Prize for literature.

Biography
Aharon Greenberg (later Megged) was born in Włocławek, Poland. In 1926, he immigrated with his parents to Mandate Palestine. He grew up in Ra'anana, attending Herzliya high school in Tel Aviv. After graduation, he joined a Zionist pioneering youth movement, training at Kibbutz Giv'at Brenner. He was a member of Kibbutz Sdot Yam for twelve years.

Megged was married to author Eda Zoritte, with whom he had two children, Ayal Megged, also a writer, and Amos Megged, a lecturer in history at University of Haifa.

Literary career
Megged was one of the founders of the Masa literary weekly, and served as its editor for fifteen years. He worked as a literary editor for the Hebrew newspapers La-merhav and Davar.  In 1977/78 he was author-in-residence at the Center for Hebrew Studies affiliated with the University of Oxford. He made several lecture tours of the United States, and was also author-in-residence at the University of Iowa. He published 35 books.

Megged's plays were performed at Habima, Ha-Ohel and other theaters. His books have been translated into numerous languages and published in the United Kingdom, the United States, Argentina, France, and other countries.

Diplomatic career
From 1968 to 1971, Megged served as cultural attaché to the Israeli embassy in London.

Awards and recognition
 In 1974, Megged won the Bialik Prize for his books The Evyatar Notebooks: a novel and Of Trees and Stones.
 In 2003, he was awarded the Israel Prize, for literature.

Megged won the Brenner Prize, the S.Y. Agnon Prize, and the Prime Minister's Prize.

See also
Hebrew literature
List of Bialik Prize recipients
List of Israel Prize recipients

References 

1920 births
2016 deaths
People from Włocławek
People from Warsaw Voivodeship (1919–1939)
Israel Prize in literature recipients
Brenner Prize recipients
Polish emigrants to Mandatory Palestine
Israeli people of Polish-Jewish descent
Herzliya Hebrew Gymnasium alumni
Israeli male dramatists and playwrights
Israeli literary critics
International Writing Program alumni
Israeli expatriates in the United Kingdom
Israeli expatriates in the United States
Recipients of Prime Minister's Prize for Hebrew Literary Works
Cultural attachés